The Francis P. Garvan–John M. Olin Medal is an annual award that recognizes distinguished scientific accomplishment, leadership and service to chemistry by women chemists. The Award is offered by the American Chemical Society (ACS), and consists of a cash prize (US$5,000) and a medal.  The medal was designed by Margaret Christian Grigor.

Background
Any individual may nominate a single eligible chemist in one year. Nominees must be a female citizen of the United States.

The award was established by Francis Garvan and Mabel Brady Garvan in 1936 in honor of their daughter. It was initially an essay contest, that ran for seven years, as a memorial to their daughter (the American Chemical Society's Prize Essay Contest). It was solely funded by the Francis P. Garvan Medal Endowment from its establishment in 1936 until 1979. W. R. Grace & Co. assumed co-sponsorship of the award from 1979 to 1983. In 1984, Olin Corporation assumed co-sponsorship. Mabel Brady Garvan remained involved with the Award through 1967.

The Garvan–Olin Award is the ACS' third-oldest award, and the first award established to honor women chemists.

Award recipients

 1937 Emma P. Carr
 1940 Mary Engle Pennington
 1942 Florence B. Seibert
 1946 Icie Macy Hoobler
 1947 Mary Lura Sherrill
 1948 Gerty Cori
 1949 Agnes Fay Morgan
 1950 Pauline Beery Mack
 1951 Katharine B. Blodgett
 1952 Gladys A. Emerson
 1953 Leonora N. Bilger
 1954 Betty Sullivan
 1955 Grace Medes
 1956 Allene R. Jeanes
 1957 Lucy W. Pickett
 1958 Arda A. Green
 1959 Dorothy Virginia Nightingale
 1960 Mary L. Caldwell
 1961 Sarah Ratner
 1962 Helen M. Dyer
 1963 Mildred Cohn
 1964 Birgit Vennesland
 1965 Gertrude Perlmann
 1966 Mary L. Peterman
 1967 Marjorie J. Vold
 1968 Gertrude B. Elion
 1969 Sofia Simmonds
 1970 Ruth R. Benerito
 1971 Mary Fieser
 1972 Jean'ne M. Shreeve
 1973 Mary L. Good
 1974 Joyce J. Kaufman
 1975 Marjorie C. Caserio
 1976 Isabella L. Karle
 1977 Marjorie G. Horning
 1978 Madeleine M. Joullié
 1979 Jenny P. Glusker
 1980 Helen M. Free
 1981 Elizabeth K. Weisburger
 1982 Sara Jane Rhoads
 1983 Ines Mandl
 1984 Martha L. Ludwig
 1985 Catherine Clarke Fenselau
 1986 Jeanette G. Grasselli
 1987 Janet G. Osteryoung
 1988 Marye Anne Fox
 1989 Kathleen C. Taylor
 1990 Darleane C. Hoffman
 1991 Cynthia M. Friend
 1992 Jacqueline K. Barton
 1993 Edith M. Flanigen
 1994 Barbara J. Garrison
 1995 Angelica Stacy
 1996 Geraldine L. Richmond
 1997 Karen W. Morse
 1998 Joanna S. Fowler
 1999 Cynthia A. Maryanoff
 2000 F. Ann Walker
 2001 Susan S. Taylor
 2002 Marion C. Thurnauer
 2003 Martha Greenblatt
 2004 Sandra C. Greer
 2005 Frances H. Arnold
 2006 Lila M. Gierasch
 2007 Laura L. Kiessling
 2008 Elizabeth C. Theil
 2009 Kathlyn A. Parker
 2010 Judith Giordan
 2011 Sherry J. Yennello
 2012 Sue B. Clark
 2013 Susan M. Kauzlarich
 2014 Marsha I. Lester
 2015 Angela K. Wilson
 2016 Annie B. Kersting
 2017 Barbara J. Finlayson-Pitts
 2018 Valerie J. Kuck
 2019 Lisa McElwee-White
 2020 Caroline Chick Jarrold
 2021 Carol J. Burns 
 2022 Anne McCoy

See also

 List of chemistry awards
 List of science and technology awards for women

References

External links
 
 

Awards established in 1936
Awards of the American Chemical Society
Science awards honoring women
Lists of women scientists
1936 establishments in the United States
Chemistry awards